Lauren Maria "Ren" Harvieu (born 3 September 1990) is an English singer and songwriter from Broughton, Salford, Greater Manchester.

Early life and education
Harvieu was introduced to music by her mother. While in sixth form college, she performed in musical theatre and entered several talent competitions before uploading some of her own recordings to MySpace.

Career
Harvieu was discovered on MySpace by a local music manager after uploading demo tracks. After being introduced to record producer Jimmy Hogarth (Amy Winehouse, Duffy) she began working on demos and was signed to Universal Music aged 18.

Harvieu started recording an album in May 2011, but before it could be released, she broke her back in what she describes as a 'freak accident', "I heard it snap. I couldn't feel my feet," the singer recalled. After a 14-hour operation, Harvieu spent months recovering at the Royal National Orthopaedic Hospital.

On 5 December 2011, the BBC announced that Harvieu had been nominated for their BBC Sound of 2012 poll. After releasing the singles "Through the Night" and "Open Up Your Arms", her first album Through the Night was released on Island Records on 14 May 2012, entering the UK Albums Chart at No 5.

In 2014, Harvieu was featured on "Sweet Malaise", the B-side to "In My Time of Dust", from Ed Harcourt's mini-album Time of Dust. "Love is a Melody", a song written by Ed Harcourt and Jimmy Hogarth for Harvieu's debut album, was also covered on Time of Dust.

Harvieu began working on her second album in 2013. The album, titled Revel in the Drama, was released in April 2020.

Discography

Albums

Singles

Guest appearances

Awards and nominations

References

External links

 

1990 births
Living people
English women pop singers
People from Broughton, Greater Manchester
21st-century English women singers
21st-century English singers